Clayton Ferreira Cruz (born 19 July 1975), known simply as Clayton, is a Brazilian former professional footballer. A forward or winger, he operated preferably on the left.

His 16-year professional career was spent, other than in his country, in Portugal – five teams represented, mainly Porto with which he won five major titles, including one Primeira Liga championship and one UEFA Cup – and Cyprus (three clubs).

Football career
Clayton was born in São João do Paraíso, Minas Gerais. After a solid career in native Brazil, mainly with Clube Atlético Mineiro, he moved to Portugal in 1999, joining Azores' C.D. Santa Clara.

In December 1999, Clayton signed for fellow Primeira Liga club FC Porto, and went on to become an important attacking element. On 25 May of the following year, in the replay match of the final of the Taça de Portugal, he was directly involved in both of his team's goals in a 2–0 win over Sporting CP.

On 17 October 2001, in the season's UEFA Champions League, Clayton scored a brace against Celtic in a 3–0 home triumph. He was also a part of the UEFA Cup-winning side in 2002–03, although he did not play in the final against the same opponent.

For 2003–04, Clayton moved to Sporting. After appearing scarcely throughout the campaign he was loaned to lowly F.C. Penafiel, representing Vitória S.C. subsequently.

After another Brazil spell with Sport Club do Recife, and another season at Penafiel (now in the Portuguese second level), Clayton moved to Cyprus. Starting 2007–08 with Alki Larnaca FC, he joined AC Omonia in the following January transfer window.

In January 2009, Clayton moved teams in the same country, signing with AEL Limassol. He returned to Brazil aged 35, playing the remainder of his career in amateur football.

Honours
Porto
Primeira Liga: 2002–03
Taça de Portugal: 1999–00, 2000–01, 2002–03
Supertaça Cândido de Oliveira: 2001; Runner-up 2000
UEFA Cup: 2002–03

AEL
Cypriot Cup: Runner-up 2008–09

References

External links
CBF data 

1975 births
Living people
Brazilian footballers
Association football wingers
Association football forwards
Campeonato Brasileiro Série A players
Campeonato Brasileiro Série B players
Clube Atlético Mineiro players
Guarani FC players
America Football Club (RJ) players
Sport Club do Recife players
Primeira Liga players
Liga Portugal 2 players
C.D. Santa Clara players
FC Porto players
Sporting CP footballers
F.C. Penafiel players
Vitória S.C. players
Cypriot First Division players
Alki Larnaca FC players
AC Omonia players
AEL Limassol players
UEFA Cup winning players
Brazilian expatriate footballers
Expatriate footballers in Portugal
Expatriate footballers in Cyprus
Brazilian expatriate sportspeople in Portugal
Brazilian expatriate sportspeople in Cyprus